"Knocked Out" is the debut single by  American singer Paula Abdul, released on May 4, 1988. It was the first song from her debut album, Forever Your Girl. It was written by Babyface, L.A. Reid and Daryl Simmons and produced in 1987 by the former two.

Personnel
 Paula Abdul: lead and background vocals
 Babyface: songwriter, producer, arranger, keyboards, background vocals
 L.A. Reid: songwriter, producer, arranger, LM-1 programming, percussion programming
 Daryl Simmons: songwriter, arranger, background vocals
 Kayo: Memory Moog bass
 Pebbles, Yvette Marine: background vocals

Charts

References

1988 debut singles
1990 singles
Paula Abdul songs
Songs written by Babyface (musician)
Songs written by L.A. Reid
Songs written by Daryl Simmons
Song recordings produced by Babyface (musician)
Virgin Records singles
1988 songs
Song recordings produced by L.A. Reid
New jack swing songs